Chapel Allerton is a ward in the metropolitan borough of the City of Leeds, West Yorkshire, England.  It contains 72 listed buildings that are recorded in the National Heritage List for England.  Of these, one is listed at Grade II*, the middle of the three grades, and the others are at Grade II, the lowest grade.  The ward is to the north of the centre of Leeds, and includes the areas of Chapel Allerton, Chapeltown, and Potternewton.  Most of the listed buildings are houses and associated structures.  The other listed buildings include churches, chapels and a synagogue, some of which have been converted for other uses, memorials in a graveyard, a packhorse bridge, public houses, a windmill converted into a house, former mill buildings, a former tannery converted for residential use, a school, public buildings, and two war memorials.


Key

Buildings

References

Citations

Sources

 

Lists of listed buildings in West Yorkshire